Cirrhochrista quinquemaculalis is a moth in the family Crambidae. It was described by Strand in 1915. It is found in Cameroon.

References

Endemic fauna of Cameroon
Moths described in 1915
Spilomelinae
Moths of Africa